"When You Loved Me" is a song written by Joy Byers and Bob Tubert and performed by Brenda Lee.  The song reached #8 on the adult contemporary chart and #47 on the Billboard Hot 100 in 1964.  It was featured on her 1965 album, Brenda Lee Sings Top Teen Hits.

The single's B-side, "He's Sure to Remember Me", reached #135 on the Billboard chart.

References

1964 songs
1964 singles
Brenda Lee songs
Decca Records singles
Songs written by Joy Byers